Auction theory is an applied branch of economics which deals with how bidders act in auction markets and researches how the features of auction markets incentivise predictable outcomes. Auction theory is a tool used to inform the design of real-world auctions. Sellers use auction theory to raise higher revenues while allowing buyers to procure at a lower cost. The conference of the price between the buyer and seller is an economic equilibrium. Auction theorists design rules for auctions to address issues which can lead to market failure. The design of these rulesets encourages optimal bidding strategies among a variety of informational settings. The 2020 Nobel Prize for Economics was awarded to Paul R. Milgrom and Robert B. Wilson “for improvements to auction theory and inventions of new auction formats.”

Introduction
Auctions facilitate transactions by enforcing a specific set of rules regarding the resource allocations of a group of bidders. Theorists consider auctions to be economic games that differ in two respects: format and information. The format defines the rules for the announcement of prices, the placement of bids, the updating of prices, the auction close, and the way a winner is picked. The way auctions differ with respect to information regards the asymmetries of information that exist between bidders. In most auctions, bidders have some private information that they choose to withhold from their competitors. For example, bidders usually know their personal valuation of the item, which is unknown to the other bidders and the seller; however, the behaviour of bidders can influence the personal valuation of other bidders.

History

Non cooperative games have a long history beginning with Cournot's Duopoly model.

1994 Nobel Laureate for Economic Sciences, John Nash, proved a general existence theorem for non-cooperative game which moves beyond simple zero-sum games. This theory was generalized by Vickrey  (1961) to deal with the unobservable value of each buyer. By the early (1970s) auction theorists had begun defining equilibrium bidding conditions for single-object auctions under most realistic auction formats and information settings. The state-of-the-art considers how multiple-object auctions can be performed efficiently

Auction types

There are traditionally four types of auction that are used for the allocation of a single item:

 First-price sealed-bid auction in which bidders place their bid in a sealed envelope and simultaneously hand them to the auctioneer. The envelopes are opened and the individual with the highest bid wins, paying the amount bid. This form of auction requires strategic considerations since bidders must not only consider their valuation but other bidders' valuations and what other bidders believe other bidders' valuations are.  The first formal analysis of such an auction was by Vickrey [1961]. For the cases of two buyers and uniformly distributed values, he showed that the symmetric equilibrium strategy was to submit a bid equal to half of the buyer's value. 
 Second-price sealed-bid auctions (Vickrey auctions) in which bidders place their bid in a sealed envelope and simultaneously hand them to the auctioneer. The envelopes are opened and the individual with the highest bid wins, paying a price equal to the second-highest bid. The logic of this auction type is that the dominant strategy for all bidders is to bid their true valuation  William Vickrey was the first scholar to study second-price valuation auctions, but their use goes back in history with some evidence suggesting that Goethe sold his manuscripts to a publisher using the second-price auction format. Online auctions often use an equivalent version of Vickrey's second-price auction wherein bidders provide proxy bids for items. A proxy bid is an amount an individual values some item at. The online auction house will bid up the price of the item until the proxy bid for the winner is at the top. However, the individual only has to pay one increment higher than the second-highest price, despite their own proxy valuation. 
 Open ascending-bid auctions (English auctions) in which participants make increasingly higher bids, each stopping bidding when they are not prepared to pay more than the current highest bid. This continues until no participant is prepared to make a higher bid; the highest bidder wins the auction at the final amount bid. Sometimes the lot is sold only if the bidding reaches a reserve price set by the seller.
 Open descending-bid auctions (Dutch auctions) in which the price is set by the auctioneer at a level sufficiently high to deter all bidders, and is progressively lowered until a bidder is prepared to buy at the current price, winning the auction.

Most auction theory revolves around these four "basic" auction types. However, others have also received some academic study (see ).

The Auction Envelope Theorem 
The Auction Envelope Theorem defines certain probabilities expected to arise in an auction.

The benchmark model

The benchmark model for auctions, as defined by McAfee and McMillan (1987) is as follows.
 All of the bidders are risk-neutral.
 Each bidder has a private valuation for the item (almost always) independently drawn from some probability distribution.
 The bidders possess symmetric information.
 The payment is represented as a function of only the bids.

The win probability

In an auction a buyer bidding  wins if the opposing bidders have lower bids.

The map from values to bids is strictly increasing, The high value buyer therefore wins.

In statistics the probability of having the "first" value is written as

With independent values and N other bidders 

The auction.
   
A buyer's payoff is         

         

Let  be the bid that maximizes the buyer's payoff.    

Therefore    

    

The equilibrium payoff is therefore    

    

Necessary condition for the maximum:    

 when     

The final step is to take the total derivative of the equilibrium payoff     

    

The second term is zero.  Therefore     

    

Then    

    

Example Uniform distribution with two buyers.

Then      

The equilibrium payoff is therefore .   

   

Then   

.   

Rearranging this expression,    

With three buyers, then 

With  buyers         

Lebrun (1996) provides a general proof that there are no asymmetric equilibria.

Optimal Auctions 
Auctions from a buyer's perspective

The revelation principle is a simple but powerful insight.

In 1979  proved a general Revenue  equivalence theorem that applies to all  buyers and hence to the seller.Their primary interest was finding out which auction rule would be better for the buyers. A rule might be, for example, that all buyers pay a nonrefundable bid. (Such auctions are conducted on-line.). The equivalence theorem shows that any allocation mechanism or auction that satisfies the four main assumptions of the benchmark model will lead to the same expected revenue for the seller.  (Buyer i of with value v  also has the same "payoff" or "buyer surplus" across all auctions).

SYMMETRIC AUCTIONS WITH CORRELATED VALUE DISTRIBUTIONS  

The first paper to build a model for a broad class of models was Milgrom and Weber's (1983) paper on auctions with affiliated values.  

In a recent Working Paper General Asymmetric Auctions, Riley (2022) provides a characterization of equilibrium bids for all value distributions.. Each buyer's value can be positively  or negatively correlated.  

The revelation principle as applied to auctions is that the marginal buyer payoff or "buyer surplus" is P(v), the probability of  being the winner. 

In every participant-efficient auction, the probability of winning is 1 for a high value buyer. The marginal payoff to a buyer is therefore the same in every such auction. The payoff must therefore be the same as well.

Auctions from the seller's perspective (revenue maximization) 

Quite independently and soon after) used the revelation principle to provide a general characterization of a revenue maximizing sealed high bid auction. In the "regular" case this is a participation-efficient auction. Setting a reserve price is therefore optimal for the seller. In the "irregular" case it has since been shown that the outcome can be implemented by prohibiting bids in certain subintervals. 

Relaxing each of the four main assumptions of the benchmark model yields auction formats with unique characteristics.

 Risk-averse bidders incur some kind of cost from participating in risky behaviours, which affects their valuation of a product. In sealed-bid first-price auctions, risk-averse bidders are more willing to bid more to increase their probability of winning, which, in turn, increases their expected utility. This allows sealed-bid first-price auctions to produce higher expected revenue than English and sealed-bid second-price auctions.
 In formats with correlated values—where the bidders’ values for the item are not independent—one of the bidders perceiving their value of the item to be high makes it more likely that the other bidders will perceive their own values to be high. A notable example of this instance is the Winner’s curse, where the results of the auction convey to the winner that everyone else estimated the value of the item to be less than they did. Additionally, the linkage principle allows revenue comparisons amongst a fairly general class of auctions with interdependence between bidders' values.
 The asymmetric model assumes that bidders are separated into two classes that draw valuations from different distributions (e.g., dealers and collectors in an antique auction).
 In formats with royalties or incentive payments, the seller incorporates additional factors, especially those that affect the true value of the item (e.g., supply, production costs, and royalty payments), into the price function.

Game-theoretic models
A game-theoretic auction model is a mathematical game represented by a set of players, a set of actions (strategies) available to each player, and a payoff vector corresponding to each combination of strategies. Generally, the players are the buyer(s) and the seller(s). The action set of each player is a set of bid functions or reservation prices (reserves). Each bid function maps the player's value (in the case of a buyer) or cost (in the case of a seller) to a bid price. The payoff of each player under a combination of strategies is the expected utility (or expected profit) of that player under that combination of strategies.

Game-theoretic models of auctions and strategic bidding generally fall into either of the following two categories. In a private values model, each participant (bidder) assumes that each of the competing bidders obtains a random private value from a probability distribution. In a common value model, the participants have equal valuations of the item, but they do not have perfectly accurate information about this valuation. In lieu of knowing the exact valuation of the item, each participant can assume that any other participant obtains a random signal, which can be used to estimate the true valuation, from a probability distribution common to all bidders. Usually, but not always, a private values model assumes that the values are independent across bidders, whereas a common value model usually assumes that the values are independent up to the common parameters of the probability distribution.

A more general category for strategic bidding is the affiliated values model, in which the bidder's total utility depends on both their individual private signal and some unknown common value. Both the private value and common value models can be perceived as extensions of the general affiliated values model.

When it is necessary to make explicit assumptions about bidders' value distributions, most of the published research assumes symmetric bidders. This means that the probability distribution from which the bidders obtain their values (or signals) is identical across bidders. In a private values model which assumes independence, symmetry implies that the bidders' values are "i.i.d." – independently and identically distributed.

An important example (which does not assume independence) is Milgrom and Weber's "general symmetric model" (1982).

Asymmetric auctions 
The earliest paper on asymmetric value distributions is by Vickrey (1961). One buyer's value is uniformly distributed on [0,1]. The other buyer has a known value of 1/2. The equilibrium bid distributions and both uniform wit support [0,1/2]..    

Jump-bidding;    

Suppose that the buyers' values are uniformly distributed on [0,1] and [0,2] Buyer 1 has the wider support. Then both continue to bid half their values except at v=1.   

The jump bid: Buyer 2 jumps from bidding 1/2 to bidding 3/4.  If buyer 1 follows suit she halves her profit margin and less the doubles her win probability (because of the tie breaking rule (a coin toss)   

So buyer 2 does not jump. This makes buyer 1 much better off. He wins for use if his value is above 1/2.    

The next paper by Maskin and Riley (2000) provides a qualitative characterization of  equilibrium bids when the "strong buyer" S has a value distribution that dominates that of the weak buyer"  under the assumption of conditional stochastic dominance. (first order stochastic dominance for every right-truncated value distribution). Another early contribution is Keith Waehrer's 1999 article.  Later published research include Susan Athey's 2001 Econometrica article, as well as Reny and Zamir (2004).

Revenue equivalence

One of the major findings of auction theory is the revenue equivalence theorem. Early equivalence results focused on a comparison of revenue in the most common auctions. In 1979  proved a much more general result. (Quite independently and soon after, this was also derived by ).The revenue equivalence theorem states that any allocation mechanism or auction that satisfies the four main assumptions of the benchmark model will lead to the same expected revenue for the seller (and player i of type v can expect the same surplus across auction types).

Winner's curse

The winner's curse is a phenomenon which can occur in common value settings—when the actual values to the different bidders are unknown but correlated, and the bidders make bidding decisions based on estimated values. In such cases, the winner will tend to be the bidder with the highest estimate, but the results of the auction will show that the remaining bidders' estimates of the item's value are less than that of the winner, giving the winner the impression that they "bid too much".

In an equilibrium of such a game, the winner's curse does not occur because the bidders account for the bias in their bidding strategies. Behaviorally and empirically, however, winner's curse is a common phenomenon, described in detail by Richard Thaler.

Optimal auctions 
With identically and independent distributed private values, Riley and Samuelson (1981)  showed that in any auction or auction like action (such as the "War of Attrition") the allocation is "participant efficient", i.e. the item is allocated to a buyer submitting the highest bid with probability 1.  They then showed that allocation equivalence implied payoff equivalence for all reserve prices. They then showed that discriminating against low value buyers by setting a minimum price or (reserve price) would increase expected revenue. Along with Myerson, they showed that the most profitable reserve price is independent of the number of bidders. There is a simple intuition. The reserve price only comes into play if there is a single bid. Thus it is equivalent to ask what reserve price would maximize the revenue from a single buyer. If values are uniformly distributed over the interval [0, 100], then the probability p(r) that this buyer's value is less than r is p(r) = (100-r)/100. Therefore the expected revenue is

p(r)*r = (100 - r)*r/100  =(r-50)*(r-50) + 25 .

Thus the expected revenue maximizing reserve price is 50.  Myerson (1981). also examined the question of whether it might ever be more profitable to design a mechanism that awards the item to a bidder other than one with the highest value. Surprisingly, this is the case. As Maskin and Riley then showed, this is equivalent to excluding bids over certain intervals above the optimal reserve price.

Bulow and Klemperer (1996) have shown that an auction with n bidders and an optimally chosen reserve price generates a smaller expected profit for the seller than a standard auction with n+1 bidders (and no reserve price).

JEL classification 
In the Journal of Economic Literature Classification System C7 is the classification for game theory and D44 is the classification for auctions.

Applications to business strategy
Scholars of managerial economics have noted some applications of auction theory in business strategy. Namely, auction theory can be applied to preemption games and attrition games.

Preemption games are a game where entrepreneurs will preempt other firms in entering a market with new technology before it's ready for commercial deployment. The value generated from waiting for the technology to become commercially viable also increases the risk that a competitor will enter the market preemptively. Preemptive games can be modeled as a first-priced sealed auction. Both companies would prefer to enter the market when the technology is ready for commercial deployment; this can be considered the valuation of both companies. However, one firm might hold information stating that technology is viable earlier than the other firm believes. The company with better information would, then, enter the market and bid to enter the market earlier, even as the risk of failure is higher.

Games of attrition are games of preempting other firms to leave the market. This often occurs in the airline industry as these markets are considered highly contestable. As a new airline enters the market, they will decrease prices to gain market share. This forces the incumbent airline to also decrease prices to avoid losing market share. This creates an auction game. Usually, market entrants will use a strategy of attempting to bankrupt the incumbent. Thus, the auction is measured in how much each firm is willing to lose as they stay in the game of attrition. The firm that lasts the longest in the game wins the market share. This strategy has been used more contemporaneously by entertainment streaming services like Netflix, Hulu, Disney+ and HBOMax who are all loss-making firms attempting to gain market share by bidding on more expansive entertainment content.

Auction Theory won a Nobel Prize   
Two professors from Stanford University Paul Milgrom and Robert Wilson successfully improved auction theory and invented several new auction formats, including Simultaneous Multiple Round Auctions (SMRA). This format combines the benefit of both English Auctions (open-outcry) and Sealed Bid auctions. SMRAs are deemed to solve the problem by Federal Communications Commission (FCC). Due to FCC wanting to sell all of its telecommunication frequency slots by using traditional auction, however, it will eventually turn out to give away the licenses for free or end up with a telecom monopoly in the United States. Eventually, simultaneous multiple round auctions have generated $20 billion in US dollars profit for the US government. 

The process of Simulations multiple round auctions is there had three to four round auctions. Every bidder has to seal their auction price; the auctioneer has to announce the highest price auction to every bidder every round. All the bidders can adjust and change their auction price and strategy after they listen to the highest auction price this round. The auction will maintain until the highest price of bidding price this round is lower than the last round’s highest bidding price.  

SMRA is the first distinguishing feature is that this auction is going place simultaneously for different frequencies, therefore, it seriously increases the cost of speculators, by the reason sealed bidding can assure all bidding is reflecting all bidder’s valuation of price to the products. The second difference is that bidding takes place in numerous rounds and announced the highest price of bidding, hence, allowing bidders to learn more about their competitors' preferences, and information and adjust their strategy accordingly. Thus, decreasing the effect of asymmetric information inside the auction. In addition, multiple round bidding can maintain the bidder being active in the auction. It has substantially increased information for the bidder to understand the highest bidder’s price because every round after the bidding the host will announce the highest bidder's price.

Footnotes

Further reading
 Cassady, R. (1967). Auctions and auctioneering. University of California Press. An influential early survey.
 Klemperer, P. (Ed.). (1999b). The economic theory of auctions. Edward Elgar. A collection of seminal papers in auction theory.
 Klemperer, P. (1999a). Auction theory: A guide to the literature. Journal of Economic Surveys, 13(3), 227–286. A good modern survey; the first chapter of the preceding book.
  Draft edition available online
  A very good modern textbook on auction theory.
 . A survey.
 Myerson, R. (1981). Optimal auction design. Mathematics of Operations Research, 6(1), 58–73. A seminal paper, introduced revenue equivalence and optimal auctions.
 Riley, J., and Samuelson, W. (1981). Optimal auctions. The American Economic Review, 71(3), 381–392. A seminal paper; published concurrently with Myerson's paper cited above.
 Parsons, S., Rodriguez-Aguilar, J. A., and Klein, M. (2011).  Auctions and bidding: A guide for computer scientists.
  A recent textbook; see Chapter 11, which presents auction theory from a computational perspective. Downloadable free online.
 
 Wilson, R. (1987a). Auction theory. In J. Eatwell, M. Milgate, P. Newman (Eds.), The New Palgrave Dictionary of Economics, vol. I. London: Macmillan.

External links
 Auctions on GameTheory.net, also available on the Wayback Machine

 
Game theory
Subfields of economics